Pavel Mašek (born 26 August 1956 in Prague) is a softball fastpitch coach.

Education 
From 1975 to 1980 Mašek attended the Foreign Trade Faculty of the Prague University of Economics, followed by the Gym Faculty of Charles University from 1983—1985, and much later, in 2005, the International Coaching College.

Playing career
In 1975—1988 he played for TJ Slavoj Prague 7. In 1986 he was selected to the All Stars team. From 1979 to 1983 he also represented TJ Motorlet, then from 1984—1988 he also represented TJ Medicina. In 1989 he moved to Denmark to play for Horsholm Softball Club, playing there until 2008. In 2003—2006 he also represented Warriors Copenhagen.

Club level coaching career
From 1983 to 1988 he was the playing coach of TJ Slavoj Prague 7. In 1992—2001 and again between 2006 and 2007 he was the playing coach of Horsholm Softball Club. From 2005 he was the coach of Penguins Softball Club

International coaching career
In 1994 Mašek was the Czech Men's National Team manager. From 1995 to 1996 he was the National Team's assistant coach under head coach R. Janousek. From 1997 to 2004 he was the first assistant coach under head coaches M. Stapleton and K. Henderson. From 2005 to 2007 he was the head coach of the Danish Ladies National Team. From 2008 he became the team manager of the Czech Men's National Team.

References

1956 births
Living people
Softball coaches
Sportspeople from Prague